Ondina modiola is a species of sea snail, a marine gastropod mollusk in the family Pyramidellidae, the pyrams and their allies.

Description
The shell reaches a length of 2 mm.

Distribution
This species occurs in the Western Mediterranean Sea (Sicily, Spain)

References

 Templado, J. and R. Villanueva 2010 Checklist of Phylum Mollusca. pp. 148–198 In Coll, M., et al., 2010. The biodiversity of the Mediterranean Sea: estimates, patterns, and threats. PLoS ONE 5(8):36pp.
 Oliver Baldoví D., 2007 : Catálogo de los Gasterópodos testáceos marinos de la parte Sur del Golfo de Valencia (España) Iberus 25(2): 29-61

External links
 To Encyclopedia of Life
 To World Register of Marine Species

Pyramidellidae
Gastropods described in 1884